Berga/Elster is a town in the district of Greiz, in Thuringia, Germany.  It is situated on the White Elster river, 14 km southeast of Gera.

History
Within the German Empire (1871–1918), Berga/Elster was part of the Grand Duchy of Saxe-Weimar-Eisenach.

Berga concentration camp 

During World War II, a slave labor camp called "Berga an der Elster" was operated here to dig 17 tunnels for an underground ammunition factory. Workers were supplied by Buchenwald concentration camp and from a POW camp, Stalag IX-B; the latter contravened the provisions of the Third Geneva Convention and the Hague Treaties.  Many prisoners died as a result of malnutrition, sickness (including pulmonary disease due to dust inhalation from tunnelling with explosives), and beatings, including 73 American POWs.

Personalities 
 Hans Bastian I. von Zehmen (1598–1638), Saxon colonel of the Leibregiment, commander of Magdeburg
 Gerhard Schot (1866–1961), geographer and oceanographer,  born in the district of Tschirma

See also
List of subcamps of Buchenwald
 Project Riese
Soldiers and Slaves (2005)

References

Further reading

External links

Greiz (district)
Grand Duchy of Saxe-Weimar-Eisenach